Eva Lynch (born 16 January 2000) is a Dutch cricketer. She made her WT20I debut for the Netherlands, against Germany, on 29 June 2019 in the 2019 ICC Women's Qualifier Europe tournament.

In August 2019, she was named in the Dutch squad for the 2019 Netherlands Women's Quadrangular Series. She played in the opening match of the series, against Ireland. Later the same month, she was named in the Dutch squad for the 2019 ICC Women's World Twenty20 Qualifier tournament in Scotland. In October 2021, she was named in the Dutch team for the 2021 Women's Cricket World Cup Qualifier tournament in Zimbabwe.

References

External links
 

2000 births
Living people
Dutch women cricketers
Netherlands women One Day International cricketers
Netherlands women Twenty20 International cricketers
Place of birth missing (living people)
21st-century Dutch women